Samuel White may refer to:
 J. Samuel White, British shipbuilding firm
 Samuel A. White (1823–1878), American politician
 Samuel Albert White (1870–1954), Australian ornithologist
 Samuel White (Irish politician) (died 1854), Member of Parliament for Leitrim
 Samuel White (Massachusetts politician) (1710–1769), lawyer in the Province of Massachusetts Bay
 Samuel White (American politician) (1770–1809), lawyer and U.S. Senator from Delaware
 Samuel White (ornithologist) (1835–1880), British/South Australian ornithologist, father of Samuel Albert White
 Samuel White (basketball) (born 1987), Australian wheelchair basketballer

See also
Sam White (disambiguation)